Urkash or Orkash is a village in Kamysty District, Kostanay Region, Kazakhstan. It is the administrative center of the Urkash Rural District (KATO code - 394857100). Population:

Geography
The village is located by river Karasu,  to the southeast of Kamysty, the administrative center of the district.

References

Populated places in Kostanay Region